The Pacific Plate is an oceanic tectonic plate that lies beneath the Pacific Ocean. At , it is the largest tectonic plate.

The plate first came into existence 190 million years ago, at the triple junction between the Farallon, Phoenix, and Izanagi Plates. The Pacific Plate subsequently grew to where it underlies most of the Pacific Ocean basin. This reduced the Farallon Plate to a few remnants along the west coast of North America and the Phoenix Plate to a small remnant near the Drake Passage, and destroyed the Izanagi Plate by subduction under Asia.

The Pacific Plate contains an interior hot spot forming the Hawaiian Islands.

Boundaries
The north-eastern side is a divergent boundary with the Explorer Plate, the Juan de Fuca Plate and the Gorda Plate forming respectively the Explorer Ridge, the Juan de Fuca Ridge and the Gorda Ridge. In the middle of the eastern side is a transform boundary with the North American Plate along the San Andreas Fault, and a boundary with the Cocos Plate. The south-eastern side is a divergent boundary with the Nazca Plate forming the East Pacific Rise. 

The southern side is a divergent boundary with the Antarctic Plate forming the Pacific–Antarctic Ridge. 

The western side is bounded by the Okhotsk Plate at the Kuril–Kamchatka Trench and the Japan Trench. The plate forms a convergent boundary by subducting under the Philippine Sea Plate creating the Mariana Trench, has a transform boundary with the Caroline Plate, and has a collision boundary with the North Bismarck Plate. 

In the south-west, the Pacific Plate has a complex but generally convergent boundary with the Indo-Australian Plate, subducting under it north of New Zealand forming the Tonga Trench and the Kermadec Trench. The Alpine Fault marks a transform boundary between the two plates, and further south the Indo-Australian Plate subducts under the Pacific Plate forming the Puysegur Trench. The southern part of Zealandia, which is to the east of this boundary, is the plate's largest block of continental crust.  Hillis and Müller are reported to consider the Bird's Head Plate to be moving in unison with the Pacific Plate, but Bird considers them to be unconnected.

The northern side is a convergent boundary subducting under the North American Plate forming the Aleutian Trench and the corresponding Aleutian Islands.

Paleo-geology of the Pacific Plate

The Pacific Plate is almost entirely oceanic crust, but it contains some continental crust in New Zealand, Baja California, and coastal California.

The Pacific Plate has the distinction of showing one of the largest areal sections of the oldest members of seabed geology being entrenched into eastern Asian oceanic trenches. A geologic map of the Pacific Ocean seabed shows not only the geologic sequences, and associated Ring of Fire zones on the ocean's perimeters, but the various ages of the seafloor in a stairstep fashion, youngest to oldest, the oldest being consumed into the Asian oceanic trenches. The oldest part disappearing by way of the plate tectonics cycle is early-Cretaceous (145 to 137 million years ago).

The Pacific Plate originated at the triple junction of the three main oceanic plates of Panthalassa, the Farallon, Phoenix, and Izanagi Plates, around 190 million years ago. The plate formed because the triple junction had converted to an unstable form surrounded on all sides by transform faults, due to the development of a kink in one of the plate boundaries. The "Pacific Triangle", the oldest part of the Pacific Plate, created during the initial stages of plate formation, is located just east of the Mariana Trench. The growth of the Pacific Plate reduced the Farallon Plate to a few remnants along the west coast of North America (such as the Juan de Fuca Plate) and the Phoenix Plate to a small remnant near the Drake Passage, and destroyed the Izanagi Plate by subduction under Asia.

References

External links

 Age of the Ocean Floor

Tectonic plates
Geology of the Pacific Ocean
Natural history of North America
Natural history of Hawaii
Natural history of Oceania
Natural history of Japan
Geology of the Russian Far East
Geology of California
Geology of New Zealand